| children          = 2
| awards           = 36th Kazuo Kikuta Theater Award (Mozart!)
| website          = 
}}
 is a Japanese actor and singer who is represented by Ken-On. His fiancé is actress and singer Natsumi Abe.

Filmography

Stage

Dramas

Films

Anime

Variety series

Dubbing

References

External links
 
 
 

Japanese male film actors
Japanese male musical theatre actors
Japanese male singers
Japanese male television actors
Japanese male child actors
Japanese male voice actors
1986 births
Living people
Male actors from Tokyo
Singers from Tokyo
Ken-On artists
21st-century Japanese male actors
21st-century Japanese male singers
21st-century Japanese singers